Saint Brandon of Man, also referred to as Brandinus, or Brendinus was Bishop of Man until approximately 1025 CE. The parish of Braddan is said to be named after him, although there have been alternative suggestions that this parish is named after St Brendan the Navigator or after the Manx word for salmon.

His feast day is celebrated on 20 October in the Eastern Orthodox Church.

References 

Christian folklore
Bishops of Sodor and Man